Take Me Home Tour may refer to:

Take Me Home Tour (Cher)
Take Me Home Tour (One Direction)